Maayan Amir (born 1978, in Hadera, Israel) is an artist, researcher, and senior lecturer at Ben-Gurion University of the Negev (BGU) Arts Department.

Biography

Amir’s collaborative work with artist Ruti Sela has been widely exhibited, including at the Sydney Biennale (2006), Istanbul Biennale (2009), and Berlin Biennale (2010), the New Museum Triennial (2015), and in such venues as the Centre Pompidou (Paris), Art in General (NY), Tate Modern, Jeu de Paume, Ludwig Museum, HKW, and Fondazione Sandretto Re Rebaudengo among others. She is the holder of the United Nations Educational, Scientific, and Cultural Organization (UNESCO) 2011 young artist award.

Amir holds a PhD from the Centre for Research Architecture at Goldsmiths, University of London and a BA and MFA from Tel- Aviv University. In 2008, she edited a book about Israeli documentary cinema titled Documentally. In 2011, she was a guest resident at the Rijksakademie, Amsterdam. She has curated exhibitions related to state power, art, and ideology. Her essays have been published internationally, in books, journals, and catalogs, and she was a researcher on the Forensic Architecture project at Goldsmiths University, London.

In recent years, her research has focused on the concept of extraterritoriality. In addition to her in-depth inquiry into existing definitions of extraterritoriality, Amir proposes that the concept may be extended to other objects and spheres of activity such as regimes of representation and information. Her work conceptualizes what she views as extraterritorial images. A definition to extraterritorial image was first included in Forensis (Sternberg Press) and later appeared in other platforms such as the New Museum Triennial “Surround Audience” catalog and in the mini special journal published by Utrecht Law Review. 

Before joining BGU, where she is also the curator of the university galleries, she was the head of the MFA in Fine Art Program at Haifa University and lectured at Tel-Aviv University at the History of Art Department. 

In 2020, Amir received the International Association for Visual Culture and the Journal of Visual Culture (IAVC / JVC) Early Career Researcher Prize for her article, “Visual Lawfare: Evidential Imagery at the Service of Military Objectives.” The prize board members included Brooke Belisle, Jill H. Casid, W. J. T. Mitchell, and Almira Ousmanova. Her book, Visual Evidence and the Gaza Flotilla Raid: Extraterritoriality and the Image, was published in 2022. The monograph expands on Amir’s concept of extraterritoriality as means of deciphering mechanisms by which the State classifies self-incriminating visual evidence to avoid accountability. This is seen through the example of the 2010 Gaza Flotilla, the Israeli Defense Force (IDF)’s raid and seizure of Flotilla footage, and the subsequent Turkish trial against Israeli Military commanders. Upon its release, the publication was reviewed by Eyal Weizman, who wrote that “[t]he book opens new channels for understanding how images become entangled in armed conflicts, and paves the way to a new form of liberating image-activism”.

Exterritory project

Consisting of video art, transdisciplinary collaborations, and techno-aesthetic interventions, Exterritory is devoted to theoretical and practical investigations of extraterritorial phenomena and ideas concerning extraterritoriality in an interdisciplinary context. Initiated by Sela and Amir in 2009, Exterritory began with the screening of a compilation of video art by Middle-Eastern artists onto sails of boats navigating the extraterritorial waters of the Mediterranean. Using the high seas as a meeting space, the intervention hoped to offer a suspension of the region’s border regimes by enabling encounters between artists and diverse participants from conflict areas which cross-border restrictions usually outlaw. Since then, Sela and Amir’s work created in the frame of the project has been shown internationally, in museums and art venues such as the HKW (Haus der Kulturen der Welt) in Berlin, the Union of Comoros Biennial in Moroni, and the New Museum in New York, amongst many others. The Exterritory project has also extended into a series of public symposia for leading thinkers and practitioners, organized in collaboration with art and cultural institutes (e.g. Kadist Art Foundation, Beit Hagefen, the Stedelijk Museum) and held in various global locations. In 2016, Punctum Books released Amir and Sela’s edited anthology on extraterritoriality––Extraterritorialities in Occupied Worlds. Professor Zygmunt Bauman commended the book saying: “this book …hits the bull's eye when it tries to capture the substance of our time in the net woven of concepts...who knows, perhaps it should be written in terms of the rapid and very profound changes in the idea of extraterritoriality and in the idea of occupation, particularly occupation in relation to the world.”

Publications - books and chapters
2022 Visual Evidence and the Gaza Flotilla Raid: Extraterritoriality and the Image, I.B. Tauris, New York.
2018 (ed. With Ruti Sela) Extraterritorialities in Occupied Worlds, Punctum Books, Santa Barbara.
2014 “Extraterritorial Images.” In Forensis: The Architecture of Truth, Sternberg Press, London.
2011 (with Ruti Sela) “Exterritory”. In Solution 196-213: United States of Palestine-Israel, ed. Joshua Simion, Sternberg Press, London.
2008 (ed. with Ruti Sela) Documentally: An Anthology of Essays on Israeli Documentary Film, in Hebrew, Am-Oved, Tel Aviv.

References

External links
Official site
Professor Zygmunt Bauman, Center for Research Architecture Goldsmiths, 2016
New York Times article
Artforum page

1978 births
Israeli women artists
Israeli curators
Living people
Israeli video artists